Love the Coopers (titled Christmas with the Coopers in the UK and Ireland) is a 2015 American Christmas comedy-drama film directed by Jessie Nelson and written by Steven Rogers. The film stars an ensemble cast, including Alan Arkin, John Goodman, Ed Helms, Diane Keaton, Jake Lacy, Anthony Mackie, Amanda Seyfried, June Squibb, Marisa Tomei, Timothée Chalamet, Olivia Wilde and features the voice of Steve Martin, and follows a dysfunctional family who reunites for the holidays.

The film was released by CBS Films (via Lionsgate) on November 13, 2015, received negative reviews and grossed $42 million.

Plot
Sam and Charlotte are divorcing after forty years of marriage. Charlotte convinces Sam to wait until after their grown children (Hank and Eleanor), grandchildren (Hank's kids Charlie, Bo and Madison), Charlotte's father and sister (Bucky and Emma) and Sam's aunt (Fishy) have enjoyed one last "perfect Christmas" before announcing the planned divorce. As scenes shift back and forth across the Cooper family members, their memories also briefly appear on screen as younger versions of themselves.

Hank, already struggling through his recent divorce from Angie, loses his job as a family holiday photographer when replaced by a machine. Eleanor has flown in but stays in an airport bar rather than going straight to her parents’ house. She meets Joe, a soldier snowed in for at least another day at the airport. Talking about their different points of views and stances on relationships, Eleanor reveals that she is secretly dating a commitment-free married man. She hates how her parents judge her for not being in a relationship, so she convinces Joe to pretend to be her boyfriend at the family dinner.

Bucky is a regular at a local diner, where he has befriended Ruby, a 20ish waitress who is unsettled. They get into a serious argument when he learns that she is leaving town to a random spot on the map, made worse by telling others but being "too cowardly" to tell him. He then apologizes and asks her to join the family dinner. High schooler Charlie drops in on his crush, Lauren, at the holiday store she works—finally making a move and sharing a kiss with her. Emma is arrested by police officer Percy Williams after she attempts to steal a piece of jewelry as a gift for Charlotte. In his car, Emma engages him in conversation, and he relents and lets her go, with a parting advice that she buy Charlotte the most expensive thing she can afford.

Sam and Charlotte continue arguing while preparing dinner. The four generations of Coopers are arriving at the house, along with Joe, Ruby, and Hank's ex-wife, Angie. Joe mistakenly says that he and Eleanor were engaged, instead of saying that they were dating. During the dinner, chaos unleashes when Hank and Angie argue about their divorce, which leads to Bo screaming at them to "just stop fighting". There is a momentary power outage, and when it comes back Eleanor is kissing Joe, Emma is drinking everyone's wine, and Ruby screams when she sees that Bucky has collapsed.

At the hospital, Hank and Ruby walk beside Bucky's gurney as he is being taken for tests. Ruby kisses Bucky on the lips – confusing but deeply touching Hank. In the waiting room, Charlotte argues with Eleanor when she figures out that she is sleeping with Bucky's physician, Dr. Morrisey, so Eleanor crushes her further by admitting that Joe is just a prop from the airport bar whom she "invented". Alone with a sleeping Bucky in his room, Charlotte and Emma argue about their broken relationship as sisters. Joe seems to leave after also realizing Eleanor's affair is with Dr. Morrisey, but she chases after him after locking Dr. Morrisey in a room, and the two share another kiss. Charlie is surprised when Lauren appears in the waiting room, responding to the text he sent her (actually, Bo sent it to "help" him). Hank comforts Ruby as part of their budding relationship. Sam and Charlotte reconcile. Emma, following Officer Percy's advice, buys Charlotte the most expensive thing she can – a shower stool from the hospital's small gift shop. Bucky regains consciousness and walks to the hospital cafeteria, watching from a distance as everyone is happily sharing a "Christmas meal", when fortuitous muzak leads the whole Cooper clan to joyfully dance around the cafeteria.

The film is narrated by the family's St. Bernard, Rags.

Cast

 Steve Martin (voice) as the Narrator/Rags the Dog
 Diane Keaton as Charlotte Cooper, Charlie, Madison and Bo's grandmother, Sam's wife, Eleanor and Hank's mother, Emma's sister, and Bucky's daughter
Quinn McColgan as Young Charlotte (12-14 Yrs)
Farelisse Lassor as 8-Year-old Charlotte 
 John Goodman as Sam Cooper, Charlie, Madison and Bo's grandfather, Charlotte's husband, Eleanor and Hank's father, and Fishy's nephew
 M.R. Wilson as Young Sam Cooper
 Alan Arkin as Bucky Newport, Eleanor and Hank’s grandfather, Charlotte and Emma’s father
 Ed Helms as Hank Cooper, Eleanor's brother, Charlotte and Sam's son, Bucky's grandson, and Charlie, Madison and Bo's father
 Phillip Zack as Young Hank Cooper
 Marisa Tomei as Emma Newport, Charlotte's sister and Bucky's daughter
 Rory Wilson as Young Emma Newport
 Amanda Seyfried as Ruby Bailey
 Sophie Guest as Young Ruby
 Olivia Wilde as Eleanor Cooper, Hank's sister, Charlotte and Sam's daughter, and Bucky's granddaughter.
 Jake Lacy as Joe Bailey, Eleanor's love interest and a soldier
 June Squibb as Aunt Fishy, Sam's aunt
 Alex Borstein as Angie, Hank's ex-wife, and Charlie, Madison and Bo's mother.
 Anthony Mackie as Officer Percy Williams
 Alicia Valentine as June
 Blake Baumgartner as Madison Cooper, Charlotte and Sam's granddaughter, Hank and Angie's daughter and Charlie and Bo's sister
 Timothée Chalamet as Charlie Cooper, Charlotte and Sam's grandson, Hank and Angie's son and Madison and Bo's brother
 Maxwell Simkins as Bo Cooper, Charlotte and Sam's grandson, Hank and Angie's son and Madison and Charlie's brother
 Jon Tenney as Dr. Morrissey
 Dan Amboyer as Jake
 Molly Gordon as Lauren Hesselberg
 Cady Huffman as Gift shop clerk

Production
Love the Coopers traces its origins to The Most Wonderful Time, a Christmas screenplay by Steven Rogers which was then picked up by Relativity Media for a film adaptation to be directed by Jessie Nelson. Diane Keaton and Robert Redford were initially cast to star in the film, which happened to also involve producer Brian Grazer and his Imagine Entertainment company. However, on July 30, 2015, Relativity themselves filed for bankruptcy, leaving the project, now named Love the Coopers, in limbo. Eventually, the film itself was acquired by CBS Films.

Principal photography began on December 19, 2014, in Pittsburgh, Pennsylvania, where scenes were filmed at Pittsburgh Crèche, at the U.S. Steel Tower, and at the PPG Place. Filming was also done on Ligonier Diamond in Ligonier. Filming took place at Butler Memorial Hospital in Butler, PA, in January and February 2015, and at Orchard Hill Church, during the week of February the first.  Filming also took place in the residential areas of Sewickley and Edgewood, at a diner in Millvale, various areas of South Fayette, Mt. Lebanon, West Mifflin, Franklin Park, Churchill and Wilkinsburg, along with the Boyce Park Slopes. Also Pittsburgh International Airport.

Release
The film was released in the United States by CBS Films (via Lionsgate) on November 13, 2015.

Box office
Love the Coopers grossed $26.3 million in North America and $16.1 million in other territories for a worldwide total of $42.4 million, against a budget of $24 million.

The film opened alongside The 33 and My All American. In its opening weekend, it was projected to gross $6–10 million from 2,603 theaters. The film grossed $2.8 million on its opening day and $8.3 million in its opening weekend, finishing third at the box office behind Spectre ($33.7 million) and The Peanuts Movie ($24 million).

Critical response
Love the Coopers received negative reviews from critics. The site's consensus reads, "Love the Coopers has a talented cast and a uniquely bittersweet blend of holiday cheer in its better moments, but they're all let down by a script content to settle for cloying smarm." On Metacritic, the film has a score of 31 out of 100, based on 26 critics, indicating "generally unfavorable reviews". Audiences polled by CinemaScore gave the film an average grade of "B−" on an A+ to F scale.

Accolades

See also
 List of Christmas films

References

External links

 
 
 
 

2015 films
2010s Christmas comedy-drama films
2015 LGBT-related films
American Christmas comedy-drama films
American LGBT-related films
Films directed by Jessie Nelson
Films shot in Pittsburgh
LGBT-related comedy-drama films
Imagine Entertainment films
CBS Films films
Lionsgate films
2010s English-language films
2010s American films